The 2023 Sunshine Ladies Tour was the 10th season of the Sunshine Ladies Tour, a series of professional golf tournaments for women based in South Africa.

Schedule
The season consisted of 6 events, all held in South Africa, played between February and March. 

The Dimension Data Ladies Pro-Am, played concurrent with the Sunshine Tour and Challenge Tour's co-sanctioned Dimension Data Pro-Am, had its purse significantly bumped to R2.5m.

The Investec South African Women's Open and the Joburg Ladies Open were again co-sanctioned with the Ladies European Tour.

Order of Merit
This shows the leaders in the final Order of Merit.

Source:

References

External links
Official homepage of the Sunshine Ladies Tour

Sunshine Ladies Tour
Sunshine Ladies Tour